

Hotels
 Hotel Europe (Sarajevo), a hotel in Sarajevo, Bosnia and Herzegovina
 Hotel Europe (Vancouver), a hotel in Vancouver, Canada
 Hotel de l'Europe (Amsterdam), a hotel in Amsterdam, Netherlands
 Hotel Europejski, a hotel in Warsaw, Poland
 Grand Hotel Europe, a hotel in Saint Petersburg, Russia
 Hotel de l'Europe, demolished in 1900 to build the Old Supreme Court Building, Singapore

Other uses
 Hotel Europe, a 1999 sculpture by HA Schult

See also
 Hôtel de l'Europe et des Princes, a hôtels particuliers in Paris
 Europa Hotel (disambiguation), or Hotel Europa